Charles G. Coffman (August 30, 1875 – August 15, 1929) was the Republican President of the West Virginia Senate from Harrison County and served from 1925 to 1925. He died in 1929.

References

West Virginia state senators
Presidents of the West Virginia State Senate
1875 births
1929 deaths